

The Statute Law Revision Act 1983 (No 11) is an Act of the Oireachtas.

Section 1 of the Act, with the Schedule, repeals, for the Republic of Ireland, various Acts of the Parliament of Ireland, the Parliament of England, the Parliament of Great Britain and the Parliament of the United Kingdom. Among these were the British version of the Act of Union 1800: the Irish version had been repealed in the Statute Law Revision (Pre-Union Irish Statutes) Act 1962. Irish, British and UK Catholic Relief Acts associated with Catholic emancipation were also repealed.

This Act has not been amended.

See also

Statute Law Revision Act

Notes

References

Parliamentary debates: 
Order for second stage  - Dáil Éireann, volume 330, 20 October 1981
Motion  - Dáil Éireann, volume 333, 24 March 1982
Second stage  - Dáil Éireann, volume 333, 25 March 1982
Motion  - Dáil Éireann, volume 339, 26 January 1983
Committee and final stages  - Dáil Éireann, volume 339, 8 February 1983
Second stage  - Seanad Éireann, volume 100, 4 May 1983
Committee and final stages  - Seanad Éireann, volume 100, 4 May 1983

External links
The Statute Law Revision  Act 1983, from the Irish Statute Book.

1983 in Irish law
Acts of the Oireachtas of the 1980s
Ireland and the Commonwealth of Nations
Statute Law Revision 1983